The Concordat of the Forty Articles was an agreement reached in 1289 between the Kingdom of Portugal and the Holy See. Signed by King Denis and Pope Nicholas IV, it ended a conflict between the Portuguese monarchy and the Papacy that had begun in 1267 under Denis's father, Afonso III. The dispute had led to the excommunication of both kings.

References

1289 in Europe
Treaties of the Holy See
Treaties of the Kingdom of Portugal
Holy See–Portugal relations